Joseph Robert Soboleski, Jr. (August 22, 1926 – November 12, 2015) was an American football guard.  

Soboleski began his football career playing for Catholic Central High School in Grand Rapids, Michigan.  After graduating from high school, Soboleski spent 18 months in the United States Navy, including eight months in the Pacific Theater during World War II.  He played college football at the University of Michigan as a defensive lineman from 1945 to 1948.   He was a starting defensive lineman on Michigan's undefeated 1947 and 1948 national championship teams.  At the conclusion of his college career, Soboleski was selected to play in the 1949 College All-Star Game in Chicago.

Soboleski was selected in the ninth round of the 1949 NFL Draft by the New York Giants, but he signed instead with the Chicago Hornets of the All-America Football Conference.  Soboleski played four years of professional football for five teams: Chicago Hornets (1949), Washington Redskins (1949), Detroit Lions (1950), the New York Yanks (1951), and the Dallas Texans (1952).  He was released by the Texans after 24-6 loss in the 1952 season opener.

References

External links
Joe Soboleski's obituary

1926 births
2015 deaths
American football guards
Chicago Hornets players
Dallas Texans (NFL) players
Detroit Lions players
Michigan Wolverines football players
New York Yanks players
Washington Redskins players
Players of American football from Grand Rapids, Michigan
United States Navy personnel of World War II